Red Moon is the second studio album by the Japanese girl group Kalafina, released on 17 March 2010 under Sony Music Japan label.

Track listing

Usage in media
 "I have a dream": theme song for the anime film Time of Eve: The Movie
 "Lacrimosa": ending theme for anime television series Black Butler
 "Hikari no Senritsu": opening theme for the anime television series Sound of the Sky

Charts

References

2010 albums
Kalafina albums
Japanese-language albums
SME Records albums